The Ato Boldon Stadium is an athletics and football stadium located in Balmain, Couva, Trinidad and Tobago. It is currently the home ground of Central and Club Sando.

History
The stadium was constructed for the 2001 FIFA U-17 World Championship which was hosted by Trinidad and Tobago, and was named for eight-time Olympic and World Championship medal winner and 1997 200m World Champion, sprinter Ato Boldon. It hosted four of the six Group C matches.

It was also used for the 2010 FIFA U-17 Women's World Cup, in which it hosted one match from Group A, one from Group B, four of the Group C matches, one of the quarter-finals and both semi-finals.

The stadium played host to a World Cup qualifier on October 10, 2017, in which Trinidad and Tobago defeated the United States 2-1; this result alongside Panama defeating Costa Rica 2-1 and Honduras defeating Mexico 3-2 sent Panama into the World Cup while simultaneously eliminating the US from qualifying. Prior to the match, the United States complained of inadequate conditions after the track separating the pitch from the stands was flooded, forcing players to be carried across.

References

Football venues in Trinidad and Tobago
Sports venues completed in 2001
2001 establishments in Trinidad and Tobago
Central F.C.